James Henry Hubert (1886-1970) was a social worker and the Executive Secretary of the New York Urban League.  In 1929, Hubert asked Margaret Sanger to open a birth control clinic in Harlem.  He wrote for the periodical Opportunity: Journal of Negro Life Hubert died on April 29, 1970 in New York at the age of 84.

Notes

American social workers
1886 births
1970 deaths